Statistics of American Soccer League II in season 1937–38.

Metropolitan Division

Playoffs

Bracket

First round

Semifinals

ASL Championship Finals

New England Division

References

American Soccer League (1933–1983) seasons
American Soccer League, 1937-38